Borough of Hackney could refer to:

London Borough of Hackney
Metropolitan Borough of Hackney (1900–1965)